The 2017 Magyar Kupa was the 18th edition of the tournament.

Schedule
The rounds of the 2017 competition are scheduled as follows:

Final four

The final four will be held on 9 and 10 December 2017 at the Császár-Komjádi Swimming Stadium in Budapest, II. ker.

Semi-finals

Final

Final standings

See also
2017–18 Országos Bajnokság I (National Championship of Hungary)

References

External links
 Hungarian Water Polo Federaration

Seasons in Hungarian water polo competitions
Hungary
Magyar Kupa Women